A two-child policy is a government-imposed limit of two children allowed per family or the payment of government subsidies only to the first two children.

A two-child policy has previously been used in several countries including Iran, Singapore, and Vietnam. In British Hong Kong in the 1970s, citizens were also highly encouraged to have two children as a limit (although it was not mandated by law), and it was used as part of the region's family planning strategies. From 2016 to 2021, it had been implemented in China, replacing the country's previous one-child policy, until it was replaced by a three-child policy to mitigate the country's falling birth rates. In July 2021, all family size limits as well as penalties for exceeding them were removed.

Africa

Egypt 
As Egypt faces over population and high densities, the city of Cairo initiated a family planning campaign known as “Two is Enough” in 2017 to encourage Egyptian families to have no more than two children. By April 2021 the program managed to refer 853,643 women to family planning clinics

Asia

East Asia

British Hong Kong  

In British Hong Kong, the Eugenics League was founded in 1936, which became The Family Planning Association of Hong Kong in 1950. The organization provides family planning advice, sex education, and birth control services to the general public of Hong Kong. In the 1970s due to the rapidly rising population, it launched the "Two is Enough" campaign, which reduced the general birth rate through educational means. The organization founded the International Planned Parenthood Federation, with its counterparts in seven other countries.
The total fertility rate in Hong Kong is currently 1.04 children per woman, one of the lowest in the world.
Although the "Two is Enough" campaign found widespread approval, it does not reflect current government policy in supporting families. Tax allowances of 100,000 HK$ per child can be claimed for up to 9 children. Furthermore, parents who have fallen into hardship can apply for special assistance from the state. This is a means-tested financial benefit, which is not limited to a particular number of children either.

China 

From 1979 until 2015, Chinese citizens were generally permitted to have only one child, with certain exceptions. The ongoing Cultural Revolution and the strain it placed on the nation were large factors. During this time, the birth rate dropped from nearly 6 children per woman to just under 3. (The colloquial term "births per woman" is usually formalized as the Total Fertility Rate (TFR), a technical term in demographic analysis meaning the average number of children that would be born to a woman over her lifetime if she were to experience the exact current age-specific fertility rates through her lifetime.) Previously, the fine is so-called "social maintenance fee" and it is the punishment for the families who have more than one child. According to the policy, the families who violate the law may bring the burden to the whole society. Therefore, the social maintenance fee will be used for the operation of the basic government.

As China's youngest generation (born under the one-child policy, which first became a requirement for most couples in 1979) came of age for formation of the next generation, a single child would be left with having to provide support for their two parents and four grandparents. In response to this issue, by 2009 all provinces allowed couples to have two children if both parents were the only children of their parents themselves. After a policy change of the Chinese government in late 2013, most Chinese provinces further relaxed the policy in 2014 by allowing families to have two children if one of the parents is an only child.

Han Chinese living in rural areas were often permitted to have two children, as exceptions existed if the first child was a daughter. Because of cases such as these, as well as urban couples who simply paid a fine (or "social maintenance fee") to have more children, the overall fertility rate of mainland China is, in fact, closer to two children per family than to one child per family (1.8). In addition, since 2012, Han Chinese in southern Xinjiang were allowed to have two children. This, along with incentives and restrictions against higher Muslim Uyghur fertility, was seen as attempt to counter the threat of Uyghur separatism.

On 29 October 2015, Xinhua reported the change in the existing law to a two-child policy citing a statement from the Chinese Communist Party. The new policy allowing Chinese couples to have two children was proposed to help address the ageing issue in China. On 27 December 2015, the new law was passed in the session of the National People's Congress Standing Committee, which governs country's laws, effective from 1 January 2016.

In 2018, about two years after the new policy reform, China is facing new ramifications from the two-child policy. Since the revision of the one-child policy, 90 million women have become eligible to have a second child. According to The Economist, the new two-child policy may have negative implications on gender roles, with new expectations for women to bear more children and to abandon their careers.

After the reform, China saw a short-lived boost in fertility rate for 2016. Chinese women gave birth to 17.9 million babies in 2016 (a record value in the 21st century), but the number of births declined by 3.5% to 17.2 million in 2017, and to 15.2 million in 2018.

In China, men have greater marital power, which increases fertility pressure on their female partners. The dynamic of relationships (amount of "power" held by each parent), and the amount of resources each parent has contributes to the struggle for dominance. Resources would be items such as income, and health insurance. Dominance would be described as who has the final say in pregnancy, who must resign in their career for maternal/parental leave. However, women have shown interest in a second child if the first child did not possess the desired gender.

Chinese couples were also polled and stated that they would rather invest in one child opposed to two children. To add, another concern for couples would be the excessive costs of raising another child; China's childcare system needs to be further developed. The change in cultural norms appears to be having negative consequences and leads to fear of a large aging population with smaller younger generations; thus the lack of workforce to drive the economy.

In May 2018, it was reported that Chinese authorities were in the process of ending their population control policies. In May 2021, the Chinese government announced it would scrap the two-child policy in favour of a three-child policy, allowing couples to have three children to mitigate the country's falling birth rates.

Middle East

Iran 
Iran authorities encouraged families in Iran not to have more than two children when conducting family planning in Iran from the early 1990s to late 2006. Iran's government "declared that Islam favoured families with only two children", as one historian put it. When the family planning program was initiated, Iran's Health Ministry launched a nationwide campaign and introduced contraceptives - pills, condoms, IUDs, implants, tubal ligations, and more.
Starting in 2006, the government's population control policy changed when Ahmadinejad called for reversal of Iran's existing policy of "two children is enough" and later in 2012 Ayatollah Khamenei also stated that Iran's contraceptive policy made sense 20 years ago, "but its continuation in later years was wrong ... Scientific and experts studies show that we will face population aging and reduction (in population) if the birth-control policy continues."

Southeast Asia

Myanmar 

In Myanmar, Rohingya people have been subjected to two-child policies. Aung San Suu Kyi, the UN and Human Rights Watch described the policy as a human rights violation in 2013.

Singapore 

In Singapore, the two-child policy until the 1980s was called "Stop at Two".

Vietnam 
Vietnam has had a population policy for over 50 years. It was launched by the Vietnamese government in the early 1960s in North Vietnam and continues in a modified form today, throughout all of Vietnam (not just the north). The policy emphasizes the official family-size goal to be một hoặc hai con, which means "one or two children."

In 2014, Vietnam had an estimated population of 92.5 million people, which represented 1.28% of the total world population. As of 2020, the total fertility rate of Vietnam is approximately 2.0, which is close to the replacement-level fertility of 2.1, the rate "at which a population exactly replaces itself from one generation to the next" according to the World Resources Institute.

History 
From 1954 to 1975, Vietnam was split into North and South Vietnam along the 17th parallel with separate governments and policies in each region. North Vietnam became the Democratic Republic of Vietnam and had a communist government, whereas South Vietnam became the Republic of Vietnam and was more aligned with the United States and other Western nations. In 1963, North Vietnam began a policy advocating a two-child norm due to the sharp population increase of the largely poor and rural population. Vietnam's family planning policy was developed before those of other countries, such as China. The government used a system of information, education, communication (IEC) campaign and publicly accessible contraceptives to curb the population. After the reunification of North and South Vietnam in 1975 under the Communist Party, there was a governmental effort to extend the policies of the North to the rest of Vietnam, which extended into the next decade. Though the government of the Republic of Vietnam adopted family planning in general as the official state policy, inadequate medical facilities prevented the policy from being effectively implemented.

In 1982, the Vietnam government practiced various family planning measures, including the allowance of use of abortion and the creation of the National Committee for Population and Family Planning. After 1983, each family was required to limit the number of children to two. In 1985, the government increased incentives, such as contraceptives and abortion acceptors, and disincentives, such as penalties for violations in family planning.

In 1986, the Party implemented the Renovation (Đổi Mới) Policy, which completely reversed the Communist Party economy to implement capitalistic market ideals. The aims of the Renovation Policy were to end Vietnam's economic isolation, increase competitiveness, and raise living standards. In an attempt to effectively develop the population socioeconomically and increase the standard of living within the population, the Vietnam government emphasized the need to contain birth rates. In 1988, the Council of Ministers issued an in-depth family planning policy, adding additional restrictions beyond the previous restriction of keeping the maximum number of children per household to two. The detailed one-or-two-child policy of Vietnam was established nine years after China's one-child policy was implemented, and elements of China's policy are reflected in Vietnam's, such as the emphasis on marrying later, postponing childbearing age (22-years of age or older for women and 24-years of age or older for men), and spacing out birth of children (3–5 years apart). The state was required to supply free birth control devices (such as intrauterine loops, condoms, and birth control pills) and to provide facilities for individuals who are eligible for abortions. Furthermore, if families did not comply with the two-child policy, they were required to pay high fees and were unable to move into urban centers.

In 1993, the Vietnamese government issued the first formalization for the unified Vietnam of the one-to-two child policy as a mandatory national policy. The policy combined advertisements and education to promote a smaller family "so people may enjoy a plentiful and happy life." The Vietnamese government explicitly linked the family planning policy with "historical and cultural traditions, value structures and development objectives," encouraging a collectivist mindset in which individuals honor the needs of the nation above their own. The goal of the policy was to reduce the Vietnamese fertility rate to the replacement level of 2.1 by 2015, so that the country could have a stable population in the mid-21st century. In 1997, the goal was accelerated to reach the replacement level by 2005, and the government subsequently integrated an increased use of abortion as a means to curb population growth.

In 2003, the Standing Parliamentary Committee of the National Assembly issued the highest legislative document on population titled the Population Ordinance, which restructured the official family planning policy. According to the ordinance, couples "shall have the right to decide on the time to have babies, the number of children and the duration between child births." However, shortly after, the government implemented the National Strategy on Population 2001-2010, which again called for decreasing the fertility rate to the replacement level by 2005. This caused controversy as individuals protested the conflicting messages purported by the government in regards to their reproductive rights. To address this confusion, the government issued Resolution 47 in 2005 which stated that "to sustain high economic growth, Viet Nam needs to pursue a population control policy until it has become an industrialized country." However at this time, the population had already reached the goal of having a total fertility rate below the replacement level.

In 2009, the Population Ordinance was amended to again restrict the number of children to be one or two children, although individuals were allowed to decide the timing and spacing of their births. The government is currently drafting a new Law on Population to replace the Population Ordinance in 2015. However, there is disagreement between policy makers and academics on what should be included in the law.

Administration 
The organizational structure of the two-child policy was housed under different governmental units since its conception in the 1960s. As the policy evolved from "Initiation in the 1960s–1970s; Maturity in the 1980s–1990s; and Legalization in the 2000s–2010s", the administration of the population policy also changed. From 1961-1983, the population program fell under the Population and Birth Control Unit. From 1984–2002, it was under the control of National Committee for Population and Family Planning. From 2003–2006, it was in the jurisdiction of the Vietnam Commission for Population, Family and Children. Since 2007, the population program has been under the General Office for Population and Family Planning.

Although the policy was advocated on the national level, the central government did not utilize specific fines or incentives, instead delegating implementation responsibilities to local governments. Each family was required to have at most two children, and local governments were responsible to decide the details of enforcement. Depending on the specific location, district governments charged fines ranging from 60 to 800 kilograms of paddy rice, equivalent to the worth of a month to a year's wages, for each additional child, and additionally, women who agreed to be sterilized were given bonuses of 120 to 400 kilograms of rice. Individuals who did not use contraceptives sometimes had their names announced over the intercom system of the village to shame them into using them, whereas individuals who did could be selected to win the Labor Medal for "good realization of the population – family planning program". The government and large companies also regularly denied people who violated the policy of their salaries, promotions, and sometimes even their jobs.

Current status 
Currently, the effective population policy is the revised 2009 Population Ordinance which states that "each couple and individual has the right and responsibility to participate in the campaigns on population and family planning, reproductive health care: (i) decide time and birth spacing; (ii) have one or two children, exceptional cases to be determined by the Government." Thus, individuals have control over the timing and spacing of the births of their children but are still restricted in the number of children they are allowed to have. Furthermore, later that year, Chief Executive Trương Tấn San stressed the need for continued diligence in population control and stated that the population of Vietnam should be 100 million people by 2020, and suggested that a new comprehensive Law on Population be introduced to the government by 2015.

Effects of this policy

Reduction of the birthrate 
The total fertility rate in Vietnam dropped from 5.6 in 1979 to 3.2 by 1993, suggesting the two-child policy was successful in containing the population growth. According to one demographic model, the Bongaarts' model of components of fertility, high rates of contraceptive use and of induced abortion are plausible explanations for the decreased fertility rate. Furthermore, because of this policy, the population has fundamentally changed their ideas of the family. In 1988, the Inter-Censal Demographic and Health Survey found that parents wanted an average of 3.3 children, and in 1994, they found that the ideal number of children fell to 2.8.

However, the reported findings differ depending on the fertility model utilized and on the particular research study cited. The United Nations Economic and Social Council for Asia and the Pacific found that the average number in household was 3.1 in 1998. In another study conducted by the America-based non-profit, non-governmental organization Population Reference Bureau, the number found was lower at 2.3. Another study, published in the Worldwide State of the Family in 1995 by Tran Xuan Nhi, found a contrasting finding that the total fertility rate only dropped slightly and the size of nuclear families experienced only a slight change, dipping from 4.8 to 4.7 from 1989 to 1994.

Sex-based differences 
There is evidence that son preference exists in Vietnam. Traditionally, men oversee and are responsible for household enterprises, managing agriculture, ancestral worship, and carrying on the family name. However, although the desire for a son is seen in the Vietnamese family's fertility practices, the desire for more than one son is not. Families with two daughters are twice as likely to have a third child than families with at least one son, presumably with the hopes that this one will be a boy. Furthermore, women who do not have any sons are around 15% less likely to use contraceptives than families who have at least one. There were also increased rates of "contraceptive failure" amongst couples who had a son, as families secretly removed an IUD to bypass the policy in hopes of having a son. This is consistent with findings from other East Asian countries in which son preference corresponds with a demand for fewer children so that families will have at least one son to maintain the ancestral line.

Despite the evidence for son preference, there is no clear evidence that Vietnam's sex ratio at birth is increasing, as seen in other East Asian countries, notably China, though evidence is conflicting depending on the source. In fact, according to the Vietnamese census data for 1989 and 1999, the sex ratios of males to females at birth are actually decreasing. On the other hand, some sources state that the impact of son preference varies by region of Vietnam. In the north, there is a strong relationship between sex bias in fertility decisions and number of male births, while in the south, this relationship is nonexistent. However, mothers who pursue certain occupations, such as government cadres and farmers, are more likely to want a particular sex of child and have higher sex-ratio differences at birth. This reflects the pressure for government employees to adhere to the two-child limit, and the perceived necessity of males for manual labor in the farm.

Criticism

Inadequate contraceptives 
Although the policy states that "the state will supply, free of charge, birth control devices... to eligible persons who are cadres, manual workers, civil servants or members of the armed forces... and poor persons who register to practice family planning... The widespread sale of birth control devices will be permitted to facilitate their use by everybody that needs them," the only modern contraceptive readily available in Vietnam is the IUD. However, many women choose not to use it due to the side effects, such as increased bleeding, back and abdominal pains, headache, and general weakness. Thus, contraceptive use is low among women under the age of 25, and experts have speculated that "contraceptive use among young women might increase if temporary, easy-to-use methods, such as the pill and the condom, were more accessible. For the government to achieve its two-child policy, the survey committee recommends increased promotion of the commercial availability of the condom and the pill, and strengthening of the government family planning program."

Increased abortion 
Abortion rates in Vietnam are unusually high by international standards, with a total abortion rate of at least 2.5 abortions per woman. Generally, the abortion rate for young age groups is higher than older age groups due to a limited awareness of contraceptive methods and availability. Individuals of lower educational levels also have higher abortion rates. Vietnam also has some of the world's most liberal abortion laws, though the Vietnamese government is aiming to reduce the number of unwanted pregnancies and abortion-related difficulties. Although sex-selective abortions were banned by the government in 2006, there is evidence that suggests that son preference is associated with a higher likelihood of repeat abortions, as women with no sons were significantly less likely to have a repeat abortion compared to women with one son.

There are multiple factors influencing Vietnam's high abortion rates. First, because women do not have access to contraceptive methods besides IUDs, whilst condoms remain expensive relative to average income, as a result many do not use effective birth control. Women who have undergone multiple abortions used short-term methods of contraceptives, such as condoms and contraceptive pills, which are less effective than long-acting contraceptives to which many do not have access. Secondly, due to the higher costs of raising a child in some geographic areas of Vietnam, abortions have become more acceptable. Furthermore, the era of modernization and development of free-market reforms since the 1980s has led to a rise in premarital and unwanted pregnancy, and subsequently increased abortion services. Additionally, the Vietnamese government has insufficient alternatives to abortion within the family planning purposes and a lack of post-abortion contraceptive dialogues for families. Thus, experts have suggested providing more diverse, long-acting contraceptive alternatives and increasing counseling for families that have experienced an abortion as methods to decrease abortion in Vietnam.

Europe

United Kingdom 
In October 2012, the Conservative Party's proposed policy of only paying child benefit for the first two children of unemployed parents has been described as a 'two-child policy', and has been fronted by the Secretary of State for Work and Pensions and former leader of the Conservative Party Iain Duncan Smith.

In April 2015, David Cameron denied any such plans to cut child benefits or tax credits. However, three months later, George Osborne, the then Chancellor, announced that child tax credits would be limited to the first two children only. This was to come into force from the 2017/2018 financial year and apply to children born after that date only. From February 2019 however the policy becomes retrospective. Families making a new benefit claim (or whose circumstances change) will have the 2-child policy applied to them irrespective of when their children were born.

The two-child policy took effect on 5 April 2017. One aspect of the new rules, termed the "rape clause"  has caused controversy. Although the policy excludes all but the first two children from all available benefits, an exemption can be applied for if the conception of the third and any further children occurred as a result of the rape of the claimant. A woman wishing to claim this exemption must fill in an eight-page form: 
"The form requires women wanting to be eligible for the exemption to sign a declaration saying they were raped or otherwise coerced into sex – and giving the child’s name. They must sign a declaration reading: 'I believe the non-consensual conception exemption applies to my child.' They must also sign another declaration that says: 'I confirm that I am not living with the other parent of this child.'"
That women must thereby identify the child in question (which is thought to be assigned a tax code created for this exemption), that first or second children conceived by rape do not count towards this exemption and that women who are still living with their abusers are not eligible are just some of the aspects of the rape clause that caused widespread condemnation. Ruth Graham, writing for Slate, summarises the issues surrounding this new policy:
"The policy and the exemption have received harsh criticism from a wide variety of sources since they were announced in 2015. One member of parliament called the exemption implementation 'inhumane and barbaric.' Feminists have pointed out the cuts disproportionately affect women. A coalition of the UK's largest Christian denominations and Jewish groups pointed out that the policy discriminates against people whose religion compels them to have larger families. A United Nations committee on children’s rights asked the British government to explain the policy last year, because of concerns about women having to somehow prove they were raped."

See also 
 Family planning
 Family planning in India – Authorities in India unsuccessfully attempted to implement a two-child policy
 One-child policy
 Only child
 Pledge two or fewer (family limitation campaign)
 Population Control Bill, 2019
 Population history of China
 Shadow Children, a young adult science fiction series about a society with a two-child policy
 Tax on childlessness
 Three-child policy

References

Further reading
 
 Zamora López, Francisco, and Cristina Rodríguez Veiga. "From One Child to Two: Demographic Policies in China and their Impact on Population." Revista Española de Investigaciones Sociológicas 172 (2020): 141-160 online.

Birth control law and case law
One-child policy
Human overpopulation
Population ecology